Double Whoopee is a 1929 Hal Roach Studios silent short comedy starring Laurel and Hardy. It was shot during February 1929 and released by Metro-Goldwyn-Mayer on May 18.

Synopsis
A hotel reception awaits an important guest - a Germanic prince referred to as His Highness and his prime minister. These disembark from their car just as Laurel and Hardy arrive. However, the Von Stroheim style prince starts a prolonged preening process on his white Prussian military uniform. Hotel staff presume Hardy is the prince and a crowd gathers as they sign the register.

Laurel and Hardy eventually show their letter of introduction - they have come to work as staff, and play the roles of a footman (Hardy) and doorman (Laurel) at a swanky Broadway hotel. Jean Harlow also makes a brief appearance in this film, as a blonde bombshell who gets partially stripped by Laurel & Hardy. One of the funnier scenes is one with an automatic elevator. A haughty prince tries to get on the elevator from the first floor. Simultaneously Oliver summons the elevator. For some reason the outer doors don't close and when the prince (who has been busy giving a speech) tries to step in, he falls into the elevator well. Oliver rides down in the elevator and disappears. The prince is pulled out of the well, all disheveled and dirty. He tries it again. This time Stan summons the elevator and the whole thing repeats.

Cast

1969 "talkie" version 
While this is a silent film, a version with post-synchronized dialogue tracks provided by voice actors was created in 1969. Laurel and Hardy imitator Chuck McCann plays both Stan and Ollie in the talking version. Dick van Dyke and McCann played Laurel and Hardy respectively in a skit on a 1958 broadcast of The Garry Moore Show. McCann also had his own local TV show in New York in the 1960s where he used puppets of Stan and Ollie to entertain kids. He was also seen in the 1970s and 1980s television commercial for ANCO windshield wipers, playing Oliver Hardy opposite Jim McGeorge, who played Stan.

References

External links 
 
 
 
 

1929 films
1929 comedy films
American silent short films
American black-and-white films
Short films directed by Lewis R. Foster
Films set in hotels
Laurel and Hardy (film series)
Metro-Goldwyn-Mayer films
Films with screenplays by H. M. Walker
1929 short films
American comedy short films
1920s American films
1960s American films
Silent American comedy films